Wan Fang (born 1952 in Beijing) is a Chinese playwright, novelist, and screenwriter. She was awarded the Lao She Literary Award in 2014. Her father was Cao Yu (1910—1996), one of China's best-known playwrights.

Works
There is a Kind of Poison 有一种毒药 play 2006
Guanxi, play 2009
libretto for The Savage Land, a 1987 opera
screenplay for Colors of the Blind, a 1997 film
Nothing in the Mirror, a 2001 TV series

References

Chinese women novelists
Chinese novelists
Chinese women dramatists and playwrights
1952 births
Lao She Literary Award
Living people
Screenwriters from Beijing
Opera librettists
Women opera librettists
Chinese screenwriters
Chinese women screenwriters
20th-century Chinese novelists
20th-century Chinese dramatists and playwrights
20th-century Chinese women writers
20th-century Chinese writers
21st-century Chinese novelists
21st-century Chinese dramatists and playwrights
21st-century Chinese women writers